Saturday's Children may refer to:
Saturday's Children (1929 film), a romantic comedy film by Gregory La Cava
Saturday's Children (1940 film), a drama film by Vincent Sherman
Saturday's Children, a 1927 play by Maxwell Anderson